Simone Lafargue (née Iribarne; 6 August 1914 – 4 May 2010) was a French tennis player. In 1943 she won the singles title at the Tournoi de France, the competition set up by the Vichy regime in place of the French Championships (later the French Open). She defeated Alice Weiwers in the final.

References

French female tennis players
1914 births
2010 deaths